The Pease River is a river in Texas, United States.  It is a tributary of the Red River that runs in an easterly direction through West Texas .  It was discovered and mapped for the first time in 1856 by Jacob de Córdova, who found the river while surveying for the Galveston, Houston and Henderson Railroad Company; it was named after Texas Governor Elisha M. Pease.  In December 1860, the Texas Rangers recaptured Cynthia Ann Parker and her daughter from the Comanche Indians at an engagement along the river.

Its course flows through "flood-prone flat terrain with local shallow depressions, surfaced by sandy and clay loams"; part of it forms the county line between Hardeman and Foard Counties.

The river has three main branches, the North Pease, Middle Pease, and Tongue (or South Pease) Rivers; the beginning of the main river is variously given as where all three branches come together, or where only the North and Middle Pease Rivers intersect.  Satellite and topographical imagery, however, clearly shows that the Tongue River empties into the Middle Pease before the latter's meeting with the North Pease.

North Pease River

Middle Pease River
It runs through flat, isolated ranch territory; the only settlement ever established on its banks was the now-ghost of Tee Pee City. The state has established a  region called the Matador Wildlife Management area along its course in northwestern Cottle County.

Tongue River
The Tongue River, or South Pease River, was named allegedly for a 19th-century disease, called "black tongue", that killed many area buffalo. A ranch club is now located near the spring, where State Highway 70 crosses the river.

See also
Quitaque Creek
Prairie Dog Town Fork Red River
Salt Fork Red River
Double Mountain Fork Brazos River
Palo Duro Canyon
Washita River
Wichita River
List of rivers of Texas

References

External links

Rivers of Texas
Rivers of Oklahoma
Tributaries of the Red River of the South